Rudolf Eggenberg (9 February 1911 – 19 December 1991) was a Swiss athlete. He competed in the men's high jump at the 1936 Summer Olympics.

References

1911 births
1991 deaths
Athletes (track and field) at the 1936 Summer Olympics
Swiss male high jumpers
Olympic athletes of Switzerland
Place of birth missing